Aleksandr Georgiyevich Bulashenko (born 18 November 1961 in Khartsyzk) is a former Russian football player.

Upon retirement as a player, he worked as a referee in the Russian Second League from 1997 to 1999.

External links
 

1961 births
Living people
Soviet footballers
Russian footballers
Association football forwards
Russian Premier League players
Russian expatriate footballers
Expatriate footballers in Hungary
FC Rostov players
FC SKA Rostov-on-Don players
PFC Krylia Sovetov Samara players
FC Zimbru Chișinău players
Bajai LSE footballers
Russian football referees
FC Taganrog players